The decay energy is the energy change of a nucleus having undergone a radioactive decay. Radioactive decay is the process in which an unstable atomic nucleus loses energy by emitting ionizing particles and radiation. This decay, or loss of energy, results in an atom of one type (called the parent nuclide) transforming to an atom of a different type (called the daughter nuclide).

Decay calculation
The energy difference of the reactants is often written as Q:

Decay energy is usually quoted in terms of the energy units MeV (million electronvolts) or keV (thousand electronvolts):

 

Types of radioactive decay include
 gamma ray
 beta decay (decay energy is divided between the emitted electron and the neutrino which is emitted at the same time)
 alpha decay

The decay energy is the mass difference Δm between the parent and the daughter atom and particles. It is equal to the energy of radiation E. If A is the radioactive activity, i.e. the number of transforming atoms per time, M the molar mass, then the radiation power P is:

or

or

Example: 60Co decays into 60Ni. The mass difference Δm is 0.003u. The radiated energy is approximately 2.8MeV. The molar weight is 59.93. The half life T of 5.27 year corresponds to the activity , where N is the number of atoms per mol, and T is the half-life. Taking care of the units the radiation power for 60Co is 17.9W/g

Radiation power in W/g for several isotopes:
 60Co: 17.9
 238Pu: 0.57
 137Cs: 0.6
 241Am: 0.1
 210Po: 140 (T = 136d)
 90Sr: 0.9
 226Ra: 0.02

For use in radioisotope thermoelectric generators (RTGs) high decay energy combined with a long half life is desirable. To reduce the cost and weight of radiation shielding, sources that do not emit strong gamma radiation are preferred. Cobalt-60 while widely used for purposes such as food irradiation is not a practicable RTG isotope as most of its decay energy is released by gamma rays, requiring substantial shielding. Furthermore its five year half life is too short for many applications.

See also
 Q value (nuclear science)

References

 Radioactivity Radionuclides Radiation by Joseph Magill and Jean Galy, Springer Verlag, 2005

Nuclear physics